The 1996–97 UCLA Bruins men's basketball team represented the University of California, Los Angeles in the 1996–97 NCAA Division I men's basketball season. Under new head coach, Steve Lavin, the Bruins began the season ranked 5th in the AP Poll, but after an overtime loss in the opener to Tulsa, the Bruins dropped and would not be ranked as high for the rest of the season. On January 18 the Bruins beat #6 Arizona, 84-78 in overtime. The team finished 1st in the conference. The Bruins competed in the 1997 NCAA Division I men's basketball tournament, losing to the Minnesota Golden Gophers in the Elite Eight. This was the first season for head coach Steve Lavin, who had been an assistant coach under Jim Harrick.

Roster

Schedule

|-
!colspan=9 style=|Exhibition

|-
!colspan=9 style=|Regular Season

|-
!colspan=9 style=| NCAA tournament

Source

Rankings

References

Ucla
Ucla
UCLA Bruins men's basketball seasons
NCAA
NCAA